Hervé Cras (7 August 1910 – 2 November 1980) was a French military and naval historian, who wrote under the pseudonym Jacques Mordal.

Born to a sailing family in Evreux, Hervé Cras fought in World War II, surviving the Dunkirk evacuation. He became Director for Historical Studies at the Musée de la Marine, Paris.

Works
 La bataille de Dunkerque, 1948
 A la poursuite du Bismarck (18-27 Mai 1941), 1948
 La campagne de Norvège, 1949
 Cassino, c.1952
 (with Albert Vulliez) La tragique destinée du Scharnhorst, c.1952. Translated by George Malcolm as Battleship Scharnhorst, 1958.
 La bataille de Casablanca : 8-9-10 novembre 1942, 1952
 Bir Hacheim: une épopée française, 1952 
 La bataille de Dakar, 1956
 (with Gabriel Auphan) La marine française pendant la seconde guerre mondiale, 1958. Translated by A. C. J. Sabalot as The French Navy in World War II, 1959.
 Vingt-cinq siècles de guerre sur mer, 1959. Translated by Len Ortzen as Twenty-five centuries of sea warfare, 1959.
 Narvik, 1960
 Dunkerque, 1960
 Les Canadiens à Dieppe, 1962. Translated by Mervyn Savill as Dieppe: the dawn of decision, 1963.
 Hold-up naval à Granville, 1964. 
 La bataille de France, 1944-1945, 1964.
 Les poches de l'Atlantique, 1965.
 Héligoland : Gibraltar allemand de la Mer du Nord, 1967.
 La guerre a commencé en Pologne, 1968.
 Versailles, 1970.
 Rommel, 2 vols., 1973.

References

1910 births
1980 deaths
French military historians
French naval historians
French military personnel of World War II
20th-century French historians
French male non-fiction writers
20th-century French male writers